The Thetford Academy is a coeducational secondary school and sixth form with academy status located in Thetford, Norfolk, England. The school has a specialism in English and Mathematics.

History
The school was established through the merger of Charles Burrell Humanities School and Rosemary Musker High School in September 2010. The Thetford Academy operated over the two former school sites until the new enlarged school building was constructed at the former Rosemary Musker High School site which, since September 2013, now accommodates pupils from both school sites.

In July 2013 it was announced that the school had joined the Inspiration Trust led by Rachel de Souza. The move is aimed at raising standards after the academy was put into special measures following an Ofsted inspection report in March 2013. The original sponsors of the academy (Wymondham College, Easton College and West Suffolk College) have all stood down to make way for The Inspiration Trust.

The school is divided into four colleges based on letters of the Greek alphabet; Alpha (specialising in English and PE), Delta (Art and Mathematics), Gamma (Religious Education and Cooking Skills) and Omega (Science and Business Skills). Students are accepted to one of the four colleges before starting year 7 based on their reported skill and grades from previous years spent in the primary school.

References

External links
The Thetford Academy official website
Key Stage 4: Option Booklet
Prospecti

Secondary schools in Norfolk
Academies in Norfolk
Inspiration Trust
Thetford